The 2013–14 Danish 2nd Divisions will be the divided in two groups of sixteen teams. The two group winners will be promoted to the 2014–15 Danish 1st Division.

Because of an uneven distribution of West and East-teams (divided by the Great Belt), two East-teams, Hellerup IK and Rishøj BK, were drawn into the West-division.

Participants

Stadia and locations

Personnel 
Note: Flags indicate national team as has been defined under FIFA eligibility rules. Players and Managers may hold more than one non-FIFA nationality.

Managerial changes

2nd Division East

League table

Results

2nd Division West

League table

Results

References

3
Danish 2nd Divisions
Danish 2nd Division seasons